Nathaniel Murray may refer to:

 Nathaniel Allison Murray, co-founder of Alpha Phi Alpha
 Nathaniel O. Murray (1834–1882), American steamboat owner and politician